Capricorne FC is a Malagasy football club who currently plays in  the THB Champions League the top division of Malagasy football.
The team is based in the Atsimo-Andrefana region in western Madagascar.

Stadium
Currently the team plays at the 5000 capacity Stade Maître Kira.

References

External links
Soccerway

Football clubs in Madagascar